Lugano Scherma is a Swiss fencing club based in Lugano. The club was founded on July 17, 2008.
The purpose of the association is to promote fencing at all, regardless of age and ability of each.
The club's emphasis is on men's and women's épée fencing. There is also a program for junior and kids fencers.

Lugano Scherma is the editor of WHITE magazine: the first issue of the magazine was 1 June 2020.

In 2018, the club's athletes Michele Niggeler and Elia Dagani won gold at the 2018 World Fencing Championships (first time in history of Switzerland) and at the 2018 European Fencing Under 23 Championships, representing the club internationally.

Team Elite
 Michele Niggeler – Bronze medal in a Team 2019 World Fencing Championships.
 Elia Dagani - Gold medal in a Team 2018 European Fencing Under 23 Championships
 Isabella Tarchini - Gold medal in Individual 2019 European Championships Master Cat. +40

Honours
Swiss Championship 2019 Zug

Executive committee
 Carlo Bettin - President
 Christian Barozzi - Vice-President & Sport Manager
 Massimo Martignoni - Finance
 Irina Plytkevich - Marketing & Sponsor
 Isabella Tarchini - Member
 Michela Merlo - Events and Paralympic fencing

Notable Coaches
 Franco Cerutti (2008 – 2013)
 Alfredo Rota (2012 – 2016)
 Andrea Candiani (2013 – 2016)
 Diego Confalonieri (2016 –2022)
 Anna Ferni (2018–2022)
 Federico Bortolini (2019–present)
 Paolo Milanoli (2022 -present)

Founders
 Francesco Wicki
 Christian Barozzi 
 Sebastiano Brenni 
 Paolo Bassanini

Honor Committee
 Renzo Boisco - 2009
 Alberto e Bona Bassanini - 2010
 Jean Aldo Cerutti  - 2011
 Paolo Bassanini, Founder - 2013
 Francesco Wicki, Founder - 2018
 Sebastiano Brenni, Founder - 2019

Special Projects
 2016 - Therapeutics Fencing: project Nastro Rosa. Fencing for women with breast cancer 
 2019 - Paralympic Fencing: school for paraplegic athletes, in partnership with Insuperabili Association and Swiss Paraplegic Association

Lugano Challenge 
The international competition of the sword organized by the club since 2008. Currently been played 7 prestigious editions of the tournament. In 2014, the competition has recorded the presence of 851 athletes from 13 nations.

Palmares Men Épée:
 2008: Max Heinzer - SUI
 2009: Edoardo Munzone - ITA
 2010: Luca Ferraris - ITA
 2011: Federico Bollati - ITA
 2012: Riccardo Schiavina - ITA
 2013: Philippe Oberson - SUI
 2014: Michael Kauter - SUI

Palmares Women Épée:
 2008: Anina Hochstrasser - SUI
 2009: Simone Naef - SUI
 2010: Melinda Mancinelli - ITA
 2011: Isabella Tarchini - SUI
 2012: Pauline Brunner - SUI
 2013: Nicole Foietta - ITA
 2014: Laura Stähli - SUI

Partnership 
The club since 2019 has a close partnership with the St. Moritz Fencing Club and Bellinzona Scherma.

References

External links
 
Member of Swiss Fencing Federation 

Fencing in Switzerland
Lugano
Sport in Ticino